York Brewery is a brewery, formerly located in York within the city walls, owned by Black Sheep Brewery in Masham where York Brewery beers are currently brewed.

History
York Brewery opened in May 1996 in York, England, using the disused brewery equipment of Lions Original Brews from Burnley and was the first brewery within the city walls for 40 years. Faced with difficulty in finding outlets for their beer, the brewery opened its first pub, The Last Drop, in a 17th century, grade II listed building in Colliergate, York, 2000. A second pub, the Three Legged Mare, opened in High Petergate, York, in July 2001. 
In 2007, it expanded so to increase its output by 50 per cent to 150 barrels a week. 

The brewery was taken over by Mitchell's Hotels and Inns of Lancaster in December 2008, which planned to expand its business and create jobs. In December 2018 Mitchells of Lancaster, and therefore York Brewery, went in to administration with the brewery and four pubs subsequently being purchased by Black Sheep Brewery. Brewing was moved to Black Sheep's Masham premises, although their stated intention was to find a new site in York.

The brewery was located centrally within York on Toft Green, and offered tours of its facilities to the public. Whilst the frontage of the brewery on Toft Green is relatively modern the rear of the building, overlooking Micklegate, is significantly older and was the birthplace of Joseph Hansom the inventor of the Hansom Cab. The building was also where the furniture company Whitby Oliver was started in 1897; that company remains the landlord to this day and its logo can still be seen on the side of the top floor offices on Micklegate.

Core Beers 
As of summer 2015 York Brewery produces five core beers that are available all year round.

Awards 
In summer 2015, Otherside IPA was awarded a Gold award in the 'Premium Bitters & Pale Ales' category at the SIBA NE Region Beer Competition 2015 and a 2nd place in the Pale & Amber 4.5-5% category in the York CAMRA LocALE awards 2015. Both were awarded at the York Beer & Cider Festival 2015 on the Knavesmire in York.

Minster Ale scooped a Bronze in the 'Bottled Gold Beers' category at the SIBA NE Region Beer Competition 2014.

In 2013, York Blonde took home a 1st place in the 'Beers under 4%' category in the York CAMRA LocALE awards.

The brewery's 'Centurion's Ghost Ale' was named champion in the Brewing Industry International Awards 2002 and won the 'Best Strong Bitter' Gold Medal at the Great British Beer Festival in 2006 and 2007. Its beer, 'Guzzler' won the gold medal in the bitter category of the Small Independent Brewers Association (SIBA) North Beer Competition in January 2006 and the gold medal in the bitter category of the North Beer Competition, held by the Society of Independent Brewers, in January 2007. 'Yorkshire Terrier' won the bronze medal in the Champion Beer of Britain competition held at the Great British Beer Festival in 2000, and the silver medal in the Society of Independent Brewers North Beer competition in February 2003.

Beer Name Origins 
Centurion's Ghost Ale, which is 5.4% alcohol by volume, is York Brewery's strongest beer and is named after an incident when an apprentice plumber saw Roman soldiers marching through the cellar of Treasurer's House in York.

'Brideshead Bitter' (no longer available) was produced in conjunction with Castle Howard, where scenes from the television series Brideshead Revisited were filmed.

Pubs 
As well as producing ales, the brewery also ran three pubs within York, namely The Three-Legged Mare, The Last Drop Inn and The Yorkshire Terrier Inn, and one, Mr. Foley's Cask Ale House, in Leeds. The Yorkshire Terrier was not acquired by Black Sheep Brewery when York Brewery was purchased out of administration in December 2018 leaving two premises in York, The Three-Legged Mare and The Last Drop Inn, and one in Leeds. York Brewery beers are however available in many other pubs throughout York and the wider Yorkshire area.

See also
 List of breweries in England

References

Breweries in Yorkshire
Companies established in 1996
Companies based in York